The Schweinskopf is a hill, 473 metres high, in the German state of Hesse. The hill is part of the Damshausen Heights (Damshäuser Kuppen). Situated on the edge of the village of Friedensdorf, it is the highest elevation in the parish.

After the Rimberg (497.1 m) and the Kappe (493.5 m), it is the third highest summit in the Damshausen Heights and highest point of the western part of the range.

Location 
The hill summit is about 800 metres east of Herzhausen and 800 metres south of the Eichelhardt (465 m). It is about 1.7 kilometres from Friedensdorf.

Footnotes

References 

Mountains of Hesse